is a former Japanese football player. He played for the Japan national team.

Club career
Nagashima was born in Kobe on April 9, 1964. After graduating from high school, he joined the Regional Leagues club Matsushita Electric (now Gamba Osaka) in 1983. In 1984, the club was promoted to the Japan Soccer League. The club won the 1990 Emperor's Cup. In 1992, Japan Soccer League dissolved and founded a new league, J1 League. On June 5, 1993, Nagashima scored a hat-trick against Nagoya Grampus Eight, becoming the first Japanese player in J1 League to do so. In 1994, he moved to Shimizu S-Pulse.

In January 1995, the Great Hanshin earthquake occurred in his local Kobe. In June, Nagashima moved to Japan Football League club Vissel Kobe to encourage those in the disaster area. In 1996, the club won the 2nd place and was promoted to J1 League. He played 138 games and scored 67 goals for the club. He retired in 2000.

National team career
On July 27, 1990, Nagashima debuted for Japan national team against South Korea. He played four games for Japan until 1991.

Personal life 
He is the father of Yūmi Nagashima (born November 23 1991), an announcer for Fuji TV.

Club statistics

National team statistics

Awards
 Japan Soccer League Best Eleven: 1989-90

References

External links
 
 Japan National Football Team Database
 

1964 births
Living people
Association football people from Hyōgo Prefecture
Japanese footballers
Japan international footballers
Japan Soccer League players
J1 League players
Japan Football League (1992–1998) players
Gamba Osaka players
Shimizu S-Pulse players
Vissel Kobe players
Footballers at the 1990 Asian Games
Association football forwards
Asian Games competitors for Japan